Avdić is a mainly Bosniak surname derived from the male given name Avdo. Notable people with the surname include:

Alen Avdić (born 1977), Bosnian footballer
Azra Avdic (born 1998), Peruvian swimmer
Demir Avdić (born 1990), Serbian footballer
Denis Avdić (born 1982), Slovenian comedian
Denni Avdić (born 1988), Swedish footballer
Marcel Avdić (born 1991), Bosnian footballer
Mehmed Avdić (born 1998), footballer
Muamer Avdić (born 1993), Bosnian footballer
Rašid Avdić (born 1980), Serbian-born Bosnian footballer
Selvedin Avdić (born 1969), Bosnian writer

Bosnian surnames